John Woods (5 November 1822 – 2 April 1892) was a politician in colonial Victoria (Australia), Minister of Railways.

Woods was the second son of Richard Woods, a Liverpool railwayman, and his wife Mary, née Cave. After being trained as an engineer, he was employed in Canada and England; and landed in Melbourne in 1852, after a chequered experience at the Ovens, M'Ivor, Goulburn, Ararat and Fiery Creek diggings, during which he was a prominent exponent of miners' rights.

Woods was returned to the Victorian Legislative Assembly in October 1859 for the Crowlands district, which he represented until August 1864 and again from April 1871 to April 1877. Woods was then elected for Stawell in May 1877, which he represented till his death. Whilst out of Parliament, from 1865 to 1870, Woods entered the Government service, and was in charge of the works at the Malmesbury reservoir, when he was summarily dismissed on an allegation, into which inquiry was refused, that he had connived at some laches on the part of the contractors. Woods took office as Minister of Railways in the first Graham Berry Government in August 1875, and made some sweeping changes in the tariff of charges. He retired with his colleagues in October of the same year, but was appointed to the same post in the second Berry Administration in May 1877, retiring in March 1880.

Woods died in Brighton, Melbourne, Victoria on 2 April 1892 and was buried in Boroondara General Cemetery.

References

 

1822 births
1892 deaths
Members of the Victorian Legislative Assembly
Engineers from Liverpool
Burials in Victoria (Australia)
19th-century Australian politicians
English emigrants to colonial Australia